Cheshire cheese is a British variety of cheese.

Cheshire cheese may also refer to:

Cheshire Mammoth Cheese, a giant cheese sent to Thomas Jefferson
Ye Olde Cheshire Cheese, a pub in the City of London
The Cheshire Cheese, a pub in the City of Westminster, London